Edwardson is an English language patronymic surname derived from the given name Edward.  There are variations, including Edwards, and the Scandinavian Edwardsen.  Notable people with the name Edwardson include:

 Åke Edwardson (born 1953), Swedish author 
 Dave Edwardson, American musician 
 Mark Edwardson (born 1967), British TV and radio news presenter

English-language surnames
Patronymic surnames
Surnames from given names